The Rambouillet is a breed of sheep in the genus Ovis. It is also known as the Rambouillet Merino or the French Merino. The development of the Rambouillet breed started in 1786, when Louis XVI purchased over 300 Spanish Merinos (318 ewes, 41 rams, seven wethers) from his cousin Charles III of Spain. The flock was subsequently developed on an experimental royal farm, the Bergerie royale (now Bergerie nationale) built during the reign of Louis XVI, at his request, on his domain of Rambouillet, 50 km southwest of Paris, which Louis XVI had purchased in December 1783 from his cousin Louis Jean Marie de Bourbon, Duke of Penthièvre. The flock was raised exclusively at the Bergerie, with no sheep being sold for several years, well into the 19th century.

Outcrossing with English long-wool breeds and selection produced a well-defined breed, differing in several important points from the original Spanish Merino.  The size was greater, with full-grown ewes weighing up to 200 lb and rams up to 300 lb. The wool clips were larger and the wool length had increased to greater than 3 in (80 mm).

In 1889, a Rambouillet Association was formed in the United States by Larmon B Townsend & Larmon G Townsend in Ionia, Michigan, with the aim of preserving the breed. An estimated 50% of the sheep on the US western ranges are of Rambouillet blood. Rambouillet stud has also had an enormous influence on the development of the Australian Merino industry though Emperor and the Peppin Merino stud.

The fleece was valuable in the manufacture of cloth, at times being woven in a mixed fabric of cotton warp and wool weft.

The breed is well known for its wool, but also for its meat, both lamb and mutton. It has been described as a dual-purpose breed, with superior wool and near-mutton breed characteristics. This breed was also used for the development of the "Barbado" or American Blackbelly sheep, which was crossed with Barbados Blackbelly and mouflon for their horns at hunting ranches.

References 

Sheep breeds
Sheep breeds originating in France